Bangaram is a 2006 Indian Telugu-language action film directed by Dharani (in his Telugu debut). This film has Pawan Kalyan in the title role and Meera Chopra, Sanusha, Ashutosh Rana, Mukesh Rishi, Raja Abel, and Reema Sen in supporting roles. The film is produced by A.M. Ratnam, who previously produced Kushi (2001).

Plot 
Bangaram is a reporter at a news channel who dreams of getting into an international news channel of BBC. To fulfill his dream, he needs Peddi Reddy's signature but gets entangled with his daughters Sandhya and Vindhya. Later, Bhooma Reddy wins over Peddi's heart and is able to convince him to marry Sandhya to his brother, but Sandhya already has her own love story with Vinay. Bangaram, feeling guilty about foiling Sandhya's escape plan and the mean looks from Vindhya, decides to help her by taking her to the city. Later, Vinay also loses contact with them because of the confusion caused by a bomb blast. Bangaram is able to find Vinay with the help of a driver and his company. Bhooma and his goons chase them, but each time, Bangaram saves Sandhya and Vinay. Unable to capture Sandhya, Bhooma kidnaps Vindhya and blackmails Bangaram that his brother will marry her if Sandhya is not returned. Bangaram goes to Bhooma, kills him and his henchmen, and saves Vindhya. In the end, it is revealed that Bangaram ultimately finds his own love during a train journey.

Cast

Soundtrack

The music for this film has been composed by Vidyasagar. The audio of the film was launched on 16 March 2006 at a silent function arranged at Sunethra School for Blind at Pedda Amberpet in the outskirts of Hyderabad on the evening of 16 March.

Release 
The Hindu wrote that "Though the subject is interesting, the director fails to handle it properly".

References

External links

2000s Telugu-language films
2000s chase films
2006 action films
2006 films
Journalism adapted into films
Indian action films
Indian chase films
Films scored by Vidyasagar
Films directed by Dharani